Kirsty Dowle (born 23 August 1991) is an English football referee who officiated at the 2022 Women's FA Cup Final, and the 2023 FA Women's League Cup Final. She officiates in the Women's Super League, and was added to the 2020 FIFA international list of women referees.

References

1991 births
Living people
Association football referees